Daniel Horacio Messina (born 5 May 1962) is a former Argentine and naturalised Paraguayan football midfielder.

After retiring as a player he coached teams in Argentina and El Salvador.

References

External links
 http://www.ceroacero.es/treinador.php?id=17030

1962 births
Living people
Argentine footballers
Argentine football managers
Expatriate football managers in El Salvador
C.D. Águila managers
Association football midfielders